Graciela Pisonero Castro (born 3 August 1982) is a Spanish sailor. She competed at the 2004 Summer Olympics and the 2008 Summer Olympics.

Notes

References

External links
 

1982 births
Living people
Spanish female sailors (sport)
Olympic sailors of Spain
Sailors at the 2004 Summer Olympics – Yngling
Sailors at the 2008 Summer Olympics – Yngling
Sportspeople from Gijón